The Alfa Romeo Tipo 308 or 8C-308 is a Grand Prix racing car made for the 3 litre class in 1938. Only four cars were produced, actually modified from Tipo C with the engine mounted lower into the chassis and a slimmer body. The chassis was derived from the Tipo C and the engine from the  8C 2900. The 308 was engineered by Gioacchino Colombo under the control of Enzo Ferrari who was then in charge of Alfa's racing team, Alfa Corse. The car debuted at the Pau Grand Prix in 1938, where two cars were entered to race, one for Tazio Nuvolari and the other for Luigi Villoresi. Both drivers had to withdraw from competition, however Nuvolari had by then set a lap record. The next race was the Tripoli Grand Prix. The new 312 (3-litre, 12 cylinders) and 316 (3-litre, 16 cylinders) were entered, but they had engine trouble during practice and Clemente Biondetti took the start at the wheel of the 308 held in reserve. He failed to finish, while Hermann Lang, driving a Mercedes-Benz W154, was the winner. In this race, Eugenio Siena, driving a 312, was killed after hitting a wall.

In the 1938 Mille Miglia, Clemente Biondetti and Carlo Pintacuda took the first two places. Biondetti's car used a  Tipo 308 engine, while Pintacuda's used a  2900B.

In 1938 and 1939, Raymond Sommer won a couple of hillclimb competitions at La Turbie with 308; Jean-Pierre Wimille won a couple of races in Europe in the 1940s. One of the cars was brought to Argentina where it gathered some success and victories in the hands of Óscar Alfredo Gálvez. The car that Gálvez used in Argentina is now in the Juan Manuel Fangio museum.

One of the cars was sold to the US after World War II and Louis Durant drove it to 6th place in the 1946 Indianapolis 500; the next year it placed 7th with Walt Brown. In 1948, Johnny Mauro drove the car to 8th place; this car is now located in the Indianapolis Motor Speedway Hall of Fame Museum. It is probably the same car that was also used in the 1940 Indianapolis 500, which was Raymond Sommer's ex car.

Overall Alfa Romeo's 3 litre formula cars (Tipo 308, 312 and 316) were not a great success. Instead, the new car for the 1500 cc class, the 158 voiturette, designed in 1937 and first raced at the Coppa Ciano in August 1938, proved much more successful.

Main victories

1938 Grand Prix Rio de Janeiro, Carlo Maria Pintacuda
1939 Circuit des Remparts - Angoulême,  Raymond Sommer
1946 Grand Prix de Bourgogne, Jean-Pierre Wimille
1946 Grand Prix du Roussillon - Circuit des Platanes - Perpignan, Jean-Pierre Wimille
1947 Grand Prix de Rosario, Achille Varzi
1948 Grand Prix São Paulo, Jean-Pierre Wimille
1949 Buenos Aires Grand Prix, Óscar Alfredo Gálvez

Indianapolis 500
1940 Chet Miller, 17th
1946 Louis Durant, 6th
1947 Walt Brown, 7th
1948 Johnny Mauro, 8th

Notes

Tipo 308
Grand Prix cars